"No Confidence Man" is a song by American singer-songwriter Elliott Smith. It was originally released in 1994 by record label Slo-Mo as the B-side to a split 7-inch vinyl single with Pete Krebs, with Krebs' track "Shytown" making the A-side, making it his first solo single.

Recording 

"No Confidence Man" was recorded in one day, on August 14, 1994. Engineering was handled by Smith.

Content 

The lyrics refer to a character named "Charlie", who has been referenced in at least one other of Smith's songs, and is a possible reference to Smith's stepfather Charlie Welch.

Release 

The single was originally released in 1994 by record label Slo-Mo.

It was re-issued in digital format in 2014 by UseMusic.org, with proceeds going to Outside/In, a not-for-profit Portland, Oregon organisation that works with homeless youth. The tracks were remixed by producer and Elliott Smith archivist Larry Crane: "I remixed these recently from excellent transfers of the original 1/4-inch, 8-track master tapes, so the audio is quite a bit better than old transfers pulled off vinyl".

Track listing 

 Side A

 Pete Krebs – "Shytown"

 Side B

 Elliott Smith – "No Confidence Man"

References

External links 

 
 UseMusic page where the song can be purchased

Elliott Smith songs
1994 songs
Songs written by Elliott Smith